Dorcaschema cinereum is a species of beetle in the family Cerambycidae. It was described by Olivier in 1795, originally under the genus Saperda. It is known from the United States.

References

Dorcaschematini
Beetles described in 1795